Hectobrocha multilinea is a moth of the subfamily Arctiinae. It was described by Thomas Pennington Lucas in 1890. It is found in Queensland, Australia.

References

Lithosiini
Moths described in 1890